The Canadian province of Manitoba was created in 1870. Manitoba has a unicameral Westminster-style parliamentary government, in which the premier is the leader of the party that controls the most seats in the Legislative Assembly.  The premier is Manitoba's head of government, and the King of Canada is its head of state and is represented by the Lieutenant Governor of Manitoba. The premier picks a cabinet from the elected members to form the Executive Council of Manitoba, and then presides over that body.

Members are first elected to the legislature during general elections. General elections must be conducted every four years from the date of the last election, but the premier may ask for early dissolution of the Legislative Assembly. An election may also happen if the governing party loses the confidence of the legislature by the defeat of a supply bill or tabling of a confidence motion.

Before 1888, Manitoba had no formal party system; premiers were officially non-partisan and were chosen by elected members of the Legislative Assembly from among themselves.

Manitoba has had 22 individuals serve as premier since the province was formed, of which six were non-partisan, nine were Progressive Conservatives, four were Liberals, four were New Democrats and one was Progressive. However, during the early years of the province, the leading minister in the legislature was designated provincial secretary and the government was de facto led by the Lieutenant Governor of Manitoba; it was not until 1874 that responsible government was introduced and the title of "premier" used. The early provincial secretaries, as the most prominent elected officials in the province, are retroactively counted as premiers in modern sources.

This article only covers the time since the province was created in 1870. Before that, the territory was part of the District of Assiniboia in Rupert's Land, and was loosely controlled by the Hudson's Bay Company.

Heather Stefanson is the incumbent premier, since November 2021.

Premiers of Manitoba

|-
|colspan="10"|Premiers of Manitoba

See also
 Premier of Manitoba
 List of premiers of Manitoba by time in office
 Leader of the Opposition (Manitoba)

References
General

 
 

Specific

External links
 Office of the Premier at the Province of Manitoba

Manitoba
List
Premiers
Premiers